Alison Gill (born 23 August 1966 in Bristol) is a British rower.
Along with Annabel Eyres she finished 5th in the women's double sculls at the 1992 Summer Olympics. Gill studied at St Hilda's College, Oxford.

References

External links
 
 

1966 births
Living people
English female rowers
British female rowers
Sportspeople from Bristol
Olympic rowers of Great Britain
Rowers at the 1988 Summer Olympics
Alumni of St Hilda's College, Oxford
Rowers at the 1992 Summer Olympics
Rowers at the 1996 Summer Olympics